Leopoldo de Anchóriz Fustel (September 22, 1932 – February 17, 1987) was a Spanish actor and writer, most notable for appearing in Spaghetti Western films.

Biography
Fustel was born in Almería, Spain on 22 September 1932. His real name was Leopoldo Anchóriz Fustel, but his stage name 'Leo Anchóriz' was instead used in films, appearing in some credits in English as 'Leo Anchoris'. He was also great friends with José María Forqué and Jaime de Armiñán, with whom he collaborated on several films, either as an actor or as a screenwriter.

In 1965, he married María Callejón.

He died on 17 February 1987 from a cardiac disease aged 54.

Filmography
He specialised in Spaghetti Western films filmed in Almería, in the 1960s and 1970s, but he also worked in various other Spanish films and television series. He also worked at the same time as a screenwriter and as an artistic director.

He has worked with directors such as José María Forqué and Italian directors Sergio Corbucci, Enzo Castellari, Franco Giraldi and Umberto Lenzi.

Throughout his film career, he has shared the screen with Agustín González, María Asquerino, Marisol, Sara Montiel and Vittorio Gassman.

1957: The Girls in Blue - Carlos - novio de Pilar
1957: K.O. Miguel - Carlos
1958: El inquilino - Inspector 
1959:  Duelo en la cañada - Ramon
1961: The Invincible Gladiator - Prime Minister Rabirus
1962: Milagro a los cobardes
1962: The Balcony of the Moon 
1962: The Legion's Last Patrol - Garcia
1963: Perseo l'invincibile - Galenore
1963: La cuarta ventana - Carlos
1963: The Blancheville Monster - Doctor LaRouche
1963: El juego de la verdad 
1963: Noches de Casablanca - Lucien
1963: Sandokan, la tigre di Mompracem - Lord Guillonk
1964: I pirati della Malesia - Lord Brook
1965: Finger on the Trigger - Ed Bannister
1965: Umorismo in nero - Gayton - segment 2 'La Mandrilla - Miss Wilma'
1966: Seven Guns for the MacGregors - Santillana
1967: Up the MacGregors! - Maldonado
1968: I tre che sconvolsero il West - Garrito Lopez
1968: Kill Them All and Come Back Alone - Deker
1969: Carola de día, Carola de noche - Comisario
1969: El escuadrón del pánico
1969: A Bullet for Sandoval - Friar
1970: Viva Cangaceiro - Colonel Minas
1970: What Am I Doing in the Middle of the Revolution? - Carrasco
1973: The Three Musketeers of the West - Aramirez
1975: Cipolla Colt - Sheriff

References

External links

1932 births
1987 deaths
Spanish male film actors
Male Spaghetti Western actors
People from Almería
20th-century Spanish male actors